The Naval Consolidated Brig, Chesapeake (NAVCONBRIG Chesapeake) or the Joint Regional Correctional Facility Mid-Atlantic is a military prison, serving as Building 500 of the Northwest Annex of the Naval Support Activity Hampton Roads in Chesapeake, Virginia.

References

External links
 Navy Consolidated Brig Chesapeake
 "U.S. Naval Consolidated Brig United States Navy, Chesapeake, Virginia." Moseley Architects.
United States Navy installations
Prisons in Virginia
Buildings and structures in Chesapeake, Virginia
Military prisons in the United States